Rogen (Swedish and Norwegian) or  (Southern Sami) is a lake on the border of Sweden and Norway.  The lake is mostly located in Härjedalen Municipality in Jämtland county in Sweden with a small portion crossing the Norwegian border in the municipalities of Røros (in Trøndelag county) and Engerdal (in Innlandet county).  The  lake is the source of Sweden's longest river, Klarälven.

On the Swedish side of the border, Rogen Nature Reserve is centred around the lake. In Norway, Rogen lies inside Femundsmarka National Park in Røros and Engerdal.  The lakes Nedre Roasten and Femunden lie just to the west of Rogen.

See also
Terminal moraine
List of glacial moraines

References

Røros
Engerdal
Härjedalen
Norway–Sweden border
International lakes of Europe
Lakes of Innlandet
Lakes of Trøndelag
Lakes of Jämtland County